The Brandon Auditorium and Fire Hall, on Holmes Ave. in Brandon, Minnesota, is a historic fire station and other facility.  It has also been known as the Brandon Auditorium and City Hall.  It was built as a Works Progress Administration project during 1935–36.  It was listed on the National Register of Historic Places in 1985.

It is a unique municipal hall.  It has been described as Minnesota's most creative WPA construction project and a symbol of its dual success in generating jobs and public buildings.  Now the Brandon History Center.

It was designed by Minneapolis architect F. Boes Pfeifer to serve as a combination gymnasium/auditorium, fire hall, and village office.  It had a  stage, and a balcony with a movie projection booth.  The two-stall fire engine garage was no longer operational since the 1970s.

References

Works Progress Administration in Minnesota
Fire stations on the National Register of Historic Places in Minnesota
Defunct fire stations in Minnesota
City and town halls in Minnesota
National Register of Historic Places in Douglas County, Minnesota
Buildings and structures completed in 1935